The Battle For Rap Supremacy: KRS-One Vs. MC Shan is a collection of songs by rappers KRS-One and MC Shan. It was released on LP and CD via Cold Chillin' Records in 1996 but is made up of the classic diss records KRS-One/Boogie Down Productions and MC Shan/The Juice Crew took shots at each other with during the infamous "Bridge Wars" in the late '80s and what is often considered the most memorable (as well as one of the first) hip-hop beefs that ever happened.

Track listing

References

Boogie Down Productions albums
1996 compilation albums